The Sun was a New York newspaper published from 1833 until 1950. It was considered a serious paper, like the city's two more successful broadsheets, The New York Times and the New York Herald Tribune. The Sun was the first successful penny daily newspaper in the United States and the first one to hire a Police reporter. It was also, for a time, the most successful newspaper in America.

The Sun is well-known for publishing  the Great Moon Hoax of 1835, as well as Francis Pharcellus Church's 1897 editorial, containing the line "Yes, Virginia, there is a Santa Claus".

History 

In New York, The Sun began publication on September 3, 1833, as a morning newspaper edited by Benjamin Day (1810–1889), with the slogan "It Shines for All".  It cost only one penny (equivalent to ¢ in ), was easy to carry, and had illustrations and crime reporting popular with working-class readers. It inspired a new genre across the nation, known as the penny press, which made the news more accessible to low-income readers at a time when most papers cost five cents to purchase.  

The Sun was the first newspaper to report crimes and personal events such as suicides, deaths, and divorces. Day printed the first newspaper account of a suicide. This story was significant because it was the first about an ordinary person. It changed journalism forever, making the newspaper an integral part of the community and the lives of the readers. Prior to this, all stories in newspapers were about politics or reviews of books or the theater. Day was the first to hire reporters to go out and collect stories. Prior to this, newspapers relied on readers sending in items, and on making unauthorized copies of stories from other newspapers. (This was in the days before the organization of syndicates like the Associated Press (AP) and United Press International (UPI). The Suns focus on crime was the beginning of "the craft of reporting and storytelling". The Sun was the first newspaper to show that a newspaper could be substantially supported by advertisements rather than subscription fees, and could be sold on the street instead of delivered to each subscriber. Its primary audience was working people. Day and The Sun recognized that the masses were fast becoming literate, and demonstrated that a profit could be made selling to the larger numbers of them. Prior to The Sun, printers produced the newspapers, often at a loss, making their living selling printing services.

The offices of the Sun were initially located on Printing House Square, now called Park Row, Manhattan, and was next to New York City Hall and New York City Police Department. An evening edition, known as The Evening Sun, was introduced in 1887.

The newspaper magnate Frank Munsey bought both editions in 1916 and merged The Evening Sun with his New York Press. The morning edition of The Sun was merged for a time with Munsey's New York Herald as The Sun and New York Herald, but in 1920, Munsey separated them again, killed The Evening Sun, and switched The Sun to an evening publishing format.

From 1914 to 1919, they moved their offices to 150 Nassau Street, one of the first skyscrapers made of steel, and one of the tallest in the city at the time. The tower was close to the New York Times Building, Woolworth Tower, and New York City Hall. In 1919, The Sun moved its offices to the A.T. Stewart Company Building, site of America's first department store, at 280 Broadway between Reade and Chambers Streets. 280 Broadway was renamed "The Sun Building" in 1928. 

A clock featuring The Sun name and slogan was built at the corner with Broadway and Chambers Street.

Munsey died in 1925 with a fortune of about 20 million dollars, and was ranked as one of the most powerful media moguls of his time, along with William Randolph Hearst of Hearst Castle. He left the bulk of his estate, including The Sun, to the Metropolitan Museum of Art. The next year The Sun was sold to William Dewart, a longtime associate of Munsey's. Dewart's son Thomas later ran the paper. In the 1940s, the newspaper was considered among the most conservative in New York City, and was strongly opposed to the New Deal and labor unions. The Sun won a Pulitzer Prize in 1949 for an exposé of labor racketeering; it also published the early work of sportswriter W.C. Heinz.

It continued until January 4, 1950, when it merged with the New York World-Telegram to form a new paper called the New York World-Telegram and Sun for 16 years; in 1966, this paper joined with the New York Herald Tribune  to briefly become part of the World Journal Tribune preserving the names of three of the most historic city newspapers, which folded amid disagreements with the labor union the following year.

Milestones 

The Sun first gained notice for its central role in the Great Moon Hoax of 1835, a fabricated story of life and civilization on the Moon which the paper falsely attributed to British astronomer John Herschel and never retracted. On April 13, 1844, The Sun published  as factual a story by Edgar Allan Poe now known as "The Balloon-Hoax", retracted two days after publication. The story told of an imagined Atlantic crossing by hot-air balloon.

Today, the paper is best known for the 1897 editorial "Is There a Santa Claus?" (commonly referred to as "Yes, Virginia, There Is a Santa Claus"), written by Francis Pharcellus Church.

John B. Bogart, city editor of The Sun between 1873 and 1890, made what is perhaps the most frequently quoted definition of the journalistic endeavor: "When a dog bites a man, that is not news, because it happens so often. But if a man bites a dog, that is news." (The quotation is frequently attributed to Charles Dana, The Sun editor and part-owner between 1868 and his death in 1897.)

In 1926, The Sun published a review by John Grierson of Robert Flaherty's film Moana, in which Grierson said the film had "documentary value". This is considered the origin of the term "documentary film".

The newspaper's editorial cartoonist, Rube Goldberg, received the 1948 Pulitzer Prize for Editorial Cartooning for his cartoon, "Peace Today". In 1949,  The Sun won the Pulitzer Prize for Local Reporting for a groundbreaking series of articles by Malcolm Johnson, "Crime on the Waterfront". The series served as the basis for the 1954 movie On the Waterfront.

The Suns first female reporter was Emily Verdery Bettey, hired in 1868. Eleanor Hoyt Brainerd was hired as a reporter and fashion editor in the 1880s. Brainerd was one of the first women to become a professional editor, and perhaps the first full-time fashion editor in American newspaper history.

Legacy 

The film Deadline – U.S.A. (1952) is a story about the death of a New York newspaper called The Day, loosely based upon the old New York Sun, which closed in 1950. The original Sun newspaper was edited by Benjamin Day, making the film's newspaper name a play on words (not to be confused with the real-life New London, Connecticut, newspaper of the same name).

The masthead of the original Sun is visible in a montage of newspaper clippings in a scene of the 1972 film The Godfather.  The newspaper's offices were a converted department store at 280 Broadway, between Chambers and Reade streets in lower Manhattan, now known as "The Sun Building" and famous for the clocks that bear the newspaper's masthead and motto. They were recognized as a New York City landmark in 1986. The building now houses the New York City Department of Buildings.

In the 1994 movie The Paper, a fictional tabloid newspaper based in New York City bore the same name and motto of The Sun, with a slightly different masthead.

In 2002, a new broadsheet was launched, styled The New York Sun, and bearing the old newspaper's masthead and motto. It was intended as a "conservative alternative" and local-news focused alternative to the more liberal/progressive The New York Times and other New York newspapers. It was published by Ronald Weintraub and edited by Seth Lipsky, and ceased publication on September 30, 2008. In 2022, it was revived as an online newspaper, under the ownership of Dovid Efune, while Lipsky remained editor.

Journalists at The Sun 
 Moses Yale Beach, an early owner of The Sun
 Charles Anderson Dana, editor and part-owner of the Sun
 John A. Arneaux, reporter in 1884
 Paul Dana, editor, 1880–1897
 W. C. Heinz, war correspondent, sportswriter 1937–1950
 Bruno Lessing, reporter, 1888–1894
 Chester Sanders Lord, journalist and managing editor, 1873-1913 
 Kenneth M. Swezey, radio/technology reporter, 1930s
 John Swinton, chief editorialist, 1875–1883 and 1892–1897

Gallery

See also 

 List of defunct American periodicals

References

Further reading 

 Lancaster, Paul. Gentleman of the Press: The Life and Times of an Early Reporter, Julian Ralph of the Sun. Syracuse University Press; 1992.
 O'Brien, Frank Michael. The Story of The Sun: New York, 1833–1918 (1918) (page images and OCR)
 Steele, Janet E. The Sun Shines for All: Journalism and Ideology in the Life of Charles A. Dana (Syracuse University Press, 1993)
 Stone, Candace. Dana and the Sun (Dodd, Mead, 1938)
 Tucher, Andie, Froth and Scum: Truth, Beauty, Goodness, and the Ax Murder in America's First Mass Medium'. Chapel Hill: University of North Carolina Press, 1994.

External links 

The Sun digitized at Chronicling America, Library of Congress (1859 to 1916, incomplete)

1833 establishments in New York (state)
1950 disestablishments in New York (state)
American penny papers
Defunct newspapers published in New York City
Publications disestablished in 1950
Publications established in 1833
Daily newspapers published in New York City